Nick Holywell-Walker is a British musician best known as the stage keyboard player for English post-punk band Killing Joke, beginning in 1994. He left in 2004 to concentrate on his own projects. A singer, songwriter, producer and composer, he resided in North London, for many years until returning to his hometown in Norfolk, England. He is founding member of UK band Wandering Crow and a father of three. 

Since 1998 he has also composed, produced and mixed soundtracks for film + TV extensively. Some notable projects include BBC's Wolfblood, and Silent Witness.

References

Bibliography
Further reading:
 

Living people
Killing Joke members
1971 births